Asadollah Nasr Esfahani (born on 10 February 1927 in Isfahan) Iranian military and politician who during the second Pahlavi period held positions such as governor of Fars and Kerman and the Minister of Interior

Early life 
Esfahani was born on 1927 in Isfahan and after completing his primary education, he entered the Shahrbani Police Higher School. He holds a bachelor's degree in law, a master's degree and a doctorate in law from the Faculty of Law and Political Science, University of Tehran, and a master's degree in management from Indiana University. Nasre is fluent in English and German.

Military and political activities 
Nasr had the rank of colonel in the police and his last position in the police was the head of the police planning department. His other services include the head of the University of Police. During the Minister of Interior, Jamshid Amouzegar was appointed governor of Kerman and Fars.

on 7 August 1977 he was named is Minister of Interior in Jamshid Amouzegar cabinet

Nasr Esfahani was introduced by Jamshid Amouzegar in 1977 as a member of the political bureau of the Rastakhiz Party.

Political activities after the revolution 
After the Iranian Revolution, Nasre Esfahani left Iran. He is currently the Secretary of the Iranian Solidarity Congress. According to Siavash Avesta, he is a founding member of more than 38 parties and groups abroad.

References 

20th-century Iranian politicians
1927 births
Government ministers of Iran
Interior Ministers of Iran
Politicians from Isfahan
People of Pahlavi Iran
Living people